Radek Philipp (born February 12, 1977) is a Czech professional ice hockey player with the HC Sparta Praha team in the Czech Extraliga.

Career statistics

References

External links 

1977 births
Avtomobilist Yekaterinburg players
Czech ice hockey defencemen
Espoo Blues players
Czech expatriate ice hockey players in Russia
HC Havířov players
HC Sparta Praha players
HC Vítkovice players
Living people
Lahti Pelicans players
Sportspeople from Ostrava
HC Košice players
Salavat Yulaev Ufa players
Czech expatriate ice hockey players in Slovakia
Czech expatriate ice hockey players in Finland
Czech expatriate ice hockey players in Sweden